Gunyarra is a rural locality in the Whitsunday Region, Queensland, Australia.

Geography 
The locality is bounded by the Bruce Highway to the east.

The North Coast railway line enters from the south-east (Thoopara) and exits to the north (Kelsey Creek / Goorganga Creek). Gunyarra railway station is an abandoned railway station in the south of the locality on the railway line.

The Whitsunday Coast Airport (formerly Proserpine Airport) is in the south of the locality, west of the railway line.

The land is in the east of the locality is used for irrigated cropping, mostly sugarcane. A cane tramway network passes through the south-east of the locality to deliver harvested sugarcane to the Prosperine sugar mill in Proserpine to the north.

The west of the locality is predominantly used for grazing on native vegetation.

History 
The locality takes its name from the railway station which is believed to be an Aboriginal word meaning crocodile.

Education 
There are no schools in Gunyarra. The nearest primary school is Proserpine State School in Proserpine to the north. The nearest secondary school is Proserpine State High School in Proserpine.

Amenities 
On Lascelles Road in the north-east of the locality are race tracks used by the Whitsunday Dirt Riders Club and the  Whitsunday Sporting Car Club.

References 

Whitsunday Region
Localities in Queensland